Eric Wesley Steelberg (born April 1, 1977) is an American cinematographer. He is a frequent collaborator of Jason Reitman, having worked with him on Juno (2007), Up in the Air (2009), Young Adult (2011), Labor Day (2013), Men, Women & Children (2014), Tully (2018), and Ghostbusters: Afterlife (2021).

Early life
Steelberg was born in 1977 in the Northridge suburb of Los Angeles. His father was a lawyer while his mother was a homemaker. He was interested in film and photography from a young age; in high school, he took photography classes and started a filmmaking club. Haskell Wexler once visited the club to discuss cinematography, which Steelberg described as "a religious experience for me and instrumental in becoming the resident camera geek". After high school, he studied still photography at Santa Monica College and planned to transfer to the UCLA School of Theater, Film and Television, but he left Santa Monica after two years without graduating.

Career
Steelberg shot his first film, a short film named The Quiz which was directed by one of his friends, a student at the University of Southern California, when he was 15. In 1999, he shot the short film H@ for writer–director Jason Reitman, whom Steelberg had known in high school, followed by Reitman's In God We Trust in 2000. He went on to work with Reitman on commercials that Reitman directed before moving on to film commercials and short films for other directors.

Steelberg's first feature film as a cinematographer was Quinceañera, released in 2006. After it was released, he was approached by Jason Reitman, who asked him to shoot Juno, which Reitman was directing. His next project was 500 Days of Summer (2009); he was recommended to Marc Webb, the film's director, by one of the producers of Juno. He shot Nanette Burstein's romantic comedy Going the Distance, released in 2010. He collaborated with Reitman on several more films: Up in the Air (2009), Young Adult (2011), Labor Day (2013), and Men, Women & Children (2014). As of 2015, Steelberg has shot five feature films for Reitman. Both Juno and Up in the Air received Academy Award nominations for Best Picture.

In television, Steelberg has photographed the pilot episode of Lone Star and the second season of Eastbound & Down. He is a member of the American Society of Cinematographers (ASC) and the Academy of Motion Picture Arts and Sciences (AMPAS).

On November 11, 2020, it was reported that Steelberg will serve as the director of cinematography on the Marvel Studios' Hawkeye series.

Filmography

Feature films

Short films

Television

References

External links

1977 births
Living people
American cinematographers
Film people from Los Angeles
People from Northridge, Los Angeles
Santa Monica College alumni